Morphiceptin is a tetrapeptide (Tyr-Pro-Phe-Pro-NH2) that is a selective μ-opioid receptor agonist. It is derived from β-casomorphin and has over 1,000 times selectivity for μ- over δ-opioid receptors. When injected intracerebroventricularly (into the ventricular system of the brain), morphiceptin had an analgesic ED50 of 1.7 nmol per animal. The analgesic effects of morphiceptin were reversed by naloxone, meaning that the analgesic effect is mediated by the μ-opioid receptor. 

Morphiceptin is the (1S,2S,3S,4S)-form whereas deproceptin is the (1S,2S,3S,4R)-form [84799-23-5].

See also 
 Casokefamide

References 

Analgesics
Opioid peptides
Tetrapeptides